William Sears McGee (September 29, 1917 – August 4, 2006) was a justice of the Supreme Court of Texas from January 1, 1969 to December 31, 1986.

References

Justices of the Texas Supreme Court
1917 births
2006 deaths
20th-century American judges